Esopus may refer to:

In New York
Esopus, New York, a town in Ulster County
Esopus (village), in the town of Esopus
Esopus Creek, a tributary of the Hudson River
Esopus Meadows Lighthouse, a lighthouse on the Hudson River near Esopus, New York
Esopus Wars, two localized conflicts between Dutch settlers and the Esopus tribe of Lenape Indians during the latter half of the 17th century
Esopus (magazine), a nonprofit arts publication based in New York
Esopus people, a tribe of Lenape Indians
Esopus Spitzenburg, a type of apple

Other
Esopus (crab), a genus of crabs in the family Epialtidae
A medieval spelling of Aesop

See also